Michael Nutt is a male Irish international lawn bowler.

Profile
He was born in 1966 and won the bronze medal in the fours with Noel Graham, Neil Booth and Jim Baker at the 2002 Commonwealth Games in Manchester. He bowls for the Old Bleach Bowling Club  and was the National triples champion in 2001 and 2019.

References

Living people
1966 births
Bowls players at the 2002 Commonwealth Games
Commonwealth Games medallists in lawn bowls
Male lawn bowls players from Northern Ireland
Commonwealth Games bronze medallists for Northern Ireland
Medallists at the 2002 Commonwealth Games